Bachman station is a Dallas Area Rapid Transit station in Dallas, Texas. The station opened as part of the Green Line's expansion in December 2010. It services nearby attractions such as Bachman Lake and surrounding neighborhoods. This is the last shared stop outbound between the Green and Orange Lines before the Orange Line branches off to Dallas/Fort Worth International Airport. Because of this, it is one of the only three-track DART stations.

History
The current Bachman station is sited on land that was purchased at the turn of the 20th century by the City of Dallas from Reverend John Bachman.

In 2014, a man was killed while trying to board a train, but was unable to do so and was pulled under the train.

References

External links 
Dallas Area Rapid Transit - Bachman Station

Dallas Area Rapid Transit light rail stations in Dallas
Railway stations in the United States opened in 2010
Railway stations in Dallas County, Texas